Jelena Trifunović (born 4 August 1991) is a Serbian handball player for CS Gloria 2018 Bistrița-Năsăud and the Serbian national team.

In the 2007 Euro Beach Handball Championships, she was the 3rd highest scorer.

She was given the award of Cetățean de onoare ("Honorary Citizen") of the city of Craiova in 2018.

International honours
EHF Cup: 
Winner: 2018

Individual awards
 Prosport Best Defender of the Romanian Liga Națională: 2018

References

External links

1991 births
Living people
Sportspeople from Kraljevo
Serbian female handball players
Expatriate handball players in Turkey
Serbian expatriate sportspeople in Croatia
Serbian expatriate sportspeople in Montenegro
Serbian expatriate sportspeople in North Macedonia
Serbian expatriate sportspeople in Romania
Serbian expatriate sportspeople in Turkey
Zağnos SK (women's handball) players
Mediterranean Games gold medalists for Serbia
Competitors at the 2013 Mediterranean Games
Mediterranean Games medalists in handball
SCM Râmnicu Vâlcea (handball) players
RK Podravka Koprivnica players
Competitors at the 2009 Mediterranean Games